The following is a list of musical works that have been released legally in a stem format for public use.

With the growing availability of amateur music-making software such as GarageBand, it has become possible for the general public to more easily make their own music.  In 2005, as an experiment, Trent Reznor of Nine Inch Nails released the stems to the single "The Hand That Feeds".  Since then, other artists have begun releasing the stems for some songs, the intention being that listeners can freely remix and reuse the music in any way desired.

Myxstem is an artist first platform of stem-based music. Until now, there hasn’t been a way for artists and their fans to have one-to-one engagement through the music, or for aspiring musicians to effortlessly participate with the recorded music they love. Musicians need monetization options and solutions that add value for their fans.

Myxstem was born in New Orleans and evolved out of an earlier incarnation (FKA Tutti Player) — an award winning technology which powered music education programs such as Berklee College of Music, Jazz at Lincoln Center and more.

In 2021, Tutti Player assembled a new team, rebranded as MYXSTEM and began releasing on both iOS and Android — providing new revenue streams for musicians, offering exceptional educational value, invigorating music catalogues and encouraging deeper, more meaningful fan engagement.

Albums

Songs

References 

Stem
Stem